Siobhan O'Neill is an English actress and musician born in Huntingdon, Cambridgeshire. She is notable for her work in television, including Thor: The Dark World, TV sitcom Him and Her, TV sitcom Not Going Out starring Lee Mack and BBC TV medical series Holby City. Siobhan O'Neill is also the drummer for all-sister rock band Kyneska (formerly Emerald Sky). She has recently filmed the role of the Housemaid in The Suspicions of Mr Whicher - The murder in Angel Lane, alongside Olivia Colman and Paddy Considine, directed by Christopher Menaul for Hat Trick Productions and ITV.

Background 
Siobhan O'Neill  was a former chess prodigy and UK British Chess Champion, winning the U8 and U9 events at the 1992 British Junior Chess Championships in Plymouth and secured a place to play against world champion Garry Kasparov at a simultaneous tournament at Simpsons-In-The-Strand.

Career 
 Thor: The Dark World (2013) Feature Film - Singer in Asgard (Singing Role)
 Him & Her (2013), BBC TV Sitcom - Katie Clark
 Holby City (2013) BBC  - Nurse
 The Suspicions of Mr. Whicher - The Murder in Angel Lane (2013) - Housemaid
 Downton Abbey (2012) - Kitchen Maid (Regular)
 Hunderby (2012)  - Housemaid
 Harry Potter and The Deathly Hallows (2009)  - Wedding Dancer
 The Knowledge of Beauty - (2008) - Marion
 The Bill (2007) Colin Wilde's Secretary
 My Family Christmas Special Lead Carol Singer

Discography 
 Album: Emerald Sky - Shadows of Darkness (2008) - Drummer/Backing Singer

References

External links
The Suspicions of Mr Whicher 2 Cast
 kyneska.com
 

Living people
English television actresses
People from Huntingdon
English film actresses
Actresses from Cambridgeshire
Year of birth missing (living people)